Pulcherianopolis or Poulcherianoupolis may refer to:
 Pulcherianopolis (Epirus), ancient town of Epirus Nova, now in Albania
 Pulcherianopolis (Phrygia), ancient town of Phrygia Pacatiana, now in Albania